English paper piecing is a method of patchwork where fabric is wrapped around fabric shapes made of thin paper cardboard or heavy paper. Once the shapes are wrapped and ready, the sewer will hand sew the shapes together one at a time until the shapes become an intricate design. The paper or cardboard is removed once the shape has been sewn to another shape on all sides.  This is an art for those who like to sew by hand. 

The practice's name comes from the fact that it originated in England in the 1770s. Once a shape, bloc, rosette, or finished piece has been made, the papers are removed, leaving the fabric as the remaining item. 

English paper piecing should not be confused with Foundation Paper Piecing, nor should its name be shortened to paper piecing. Calling it paper piecing only confuses the art of English Paper Piecing. 
 
Foundation Paper Piecing uses paper to help create fabric shapes but it uses a sewing machine to sew the fabric shapes together along lines on the paper. Paper is removed after sewing.

References

External links 

 Flossie Teacakes' Guide to English Paper Piecing - Google Books

Quilting